Abdullah Mando (born 9 October 1971) is a former Syrian footballer who played for Syria national football team.

External links

zerozero.pt

1971 births
Syrian footballers
Living people
Syria international footballers
Place of birth missing (living people)
Tishreen SC players
Association football midfielders
Syrian Premier League players